Ahmed Kamel Shatta (born 27 January 1961) is a retired Egyptian athlete in track and  field who represented Egypt in shot put winning five silver medals in shot put at the African Championships in Athletics. He died on 4 May 2016 in Dubai, UAE (aged 55).

Biography
He also represented Egypt in 1984 and 1988 Summer Olympics. His  personal best is 20.76 metres scored in 1988. He now lives in the Dubai.

Achievements

References

External links
 
 
 
 

1961 births
Living people
Egyptian male shot putters
Olympic athletes of Egypt
Athletes (track and field) at the 1984 Summer Olympics
Athletes (track and field) at the 1988 Summer Olympics